Vermicella is a genus of venomous snakes of the family Elapidae, commonly known as bandy-bandies or hoop snakes. The best known species is the bandy-bandy (V. annulata).

Species
Six species are recognized as being valid. In mid 2018 a new species of bandy-bandy was discovered in Australia, visually nearly identical to Vermicella annulata. The species named Vermicella parscauda is considerably more venomous, with a toxin that is comparable to that of the red-bellied black snake (Pseudechis porphyriacus).

Vermicella annulata  – bandy-bandy 
 One species of Vermicella is the Bandy-Bandy commonly found in Australia. This snake is highly venomous and relatively small sizing between 50 and 100 cm. Bandy-Bandy's use there banded black and white pattern to repel predators by moving rapidly causing a flicker visual allusion.
Vermicella intermedia  – intermediate bandy-bandy
Vermicella multifasciata  – northern bandy-bandy
Vermicella snelli  – Pilbara bandy-bandy
Vermicella vermiformis  – Centralian bandy-bandy
Vermicella parscauda  – Weipa bandy-bandy.

Nota bene: A binomial authority in parentheses indicates that the species was originally described in a genus other than Vermicella.

References

Further reading
Gray JE (1858). In: Günther A (1858). Catalogue of the Colubrine Snakes in the Collection of the British Museum. London: Trustees of the British Museum. (Taylor and Francis, printers). xvi + 281 pp. (Vermicella, new genus, p. 236).

External links

 
Snake genera
Taxa named by John Edward Gray
Snakes of Australia